The SSBS was a series of French military medium-range ballistic missiles.

Overview
The first series, SSBS S1, was launched between 1965 and 1968.

References

Ballistic missiles of France
Experimental rockets
Cancelled spacecraft
Cancelled space launch vehicles
Projects established in 1965
1960s in France

Medium-range ballistic missiles